Prissila Stephany Howard Neira (born 21 September 1991) is a Peruvian model, TV Host  and beauty pageant titleholder who won Miss Peru 2017 and represented Peru at the Miss Universe 2017 pageant.

Early life
Howard was born in Piura but she grew up in Lima. She studied and graduated in Human Resources and Business Administration in Universidad Peruana de Ciencias Aplicadas.

Pageantry

Miss Teenager Peru 2009
In 2009, Howard joined the Miss Teenager Peru 2009 where she was awarded Miss Elegance and Best Runway.

Miss Teen del Pacifico 2010
In 2010, Howard won Miss Teen del Pacifico for that year.

Miss Peru 2016
Howard placed 1st Runner-up in Miss Peru 2016 while traditionally the 1st Runner-up represented her country at the Miss Grand International 2016 pageant in Westgate Las Vegas Resort & Casino in Las Vegas, Nevada.

Miss Grand International 2016
Howard represented Peru at Miss Grand International 2016 in Las Vegas on October 25, 2016, where she finished in the Top 10 semi-finalists.

Miss Peru 2017
Howard announced the winner for crowning Miss Peru 2017 pageant on September 12, 2017, and then competed at Miss Universe 2017.

Miss Universe 2017
Howard represented Peru at Miss Universe 2017 but she failed in the Top 16 semifinalists.

Filmography

Television
La modelo eres tú (2010)
Dame que Te Doy (2011)
Bienvenida la Tarde (2011-2012)
Esto es Guerra (2013)
Fábrica de Sueños (2013)

References

External links
 
 

1991 births
Living people
People from Piura
Peruvian female models
Peruvian women in business
Miss Universe 2017 contestants
Peruvian people of British descent
Peruvian beauty pageant winners